

S

References

Lists of words